West Brook Senior High School is a high school in the city of Beaumont, Texas. It is operated by the Beaumont Independent School District and was formed in 1982 as a court-ordered measure to integrate the schools of the formerly separate South Park Independent School District.

West Brook is located at 8750 Phelan Boulevard. The school's official mascot is the Bruin Bear.

History
West Brook was formed in 1982 from the court-ordered merger of two of the high schools in the former South Park Independent School District: the black Hebert High School, whose campus initially housed the ninth and tenth grades, and the almost all-white Forest Park High School, which initially housed the eleventh and twelfth grades. The students voted on the name and the mascot. The other majority-white high school in the district, South Park High School, was also merged into West Brook in 1986.

West Brook is now located on the former Forest Park campus.

State football championship
In its first year, an integrated team from West Brook under the former Hebert coach, Alexander Durley, won the state 5A football championship. Durley died of cancer after two seasons as head football coach of the Bruins, and the school's former stadium was named Alex Durley Stadium in his honor. West Brook now plays home games at the Carrol A. "Butch" Thomas Educational Support Center, together with other city high schools.

Bus accident
On March 29, 2006, the varsity girls' soccer team was traveling to a road game in Humble when their charter bus overturned on the highway outside Devers. Two girls were killed in the accident. The team and their parents subsequently helped pass what became known as Ashley and Alicia's Law, a state law requiring seat belts on all school buses purchased on or after September 1, 2010, and on all charter buses purchased on or after September 1, 2011.

Demographics
The demographic breakdown of the 2,284 students enrolled for the 2021-2022 school year is as follows:
Male - 52%
Female - 48%
Native American/Alaskan Native - 0.3%
Asian - 7%
Native Hawaiian/Pacific Islander - 0.1%
Black - 48.9%
Hispanic - 20.1%
White - 21.1%
Multiracial - 2.5%

Notable alumni

Chip Ambres - former MLB outfielder
Jerry Ball - former NFL nose tackle
Michael Batiste - former NFL offensive lineman
Reggie Begelton - Former CFL and Current NFL Receiver   
James Brown -  former quarterback for the Texas Longhorns
Jay Bruce - MLB outfielder
Darrell Colbert – former NFL and WLAF wide receiver
Ryan Grant - former NFL wide receiver
Christine Michael - former NFL running back
Frank Middleton - former NFL offensive lineman
Meghan Miller - actress, contestant in season 2 of America's Got Talent
Taylor Reed - CFL linebacker
Omar Sneed - former basketball player
Jason Tyner - former MLB outfielder
Mickey Washington - former NFL cornerback
Stacey Lewis Jr Beaumont ISD Trustee 2021-present - https://www.bmtisd.com/Page/178
Dan Moore NFL player

References

External links
West Brook High School

West Brook High School (old site)

Education in Beaumont, Texas
Beaumont Independent School District high schools
1982 establishments in Texas